Salah Bouzrara (born 20 January 2000) is a French professional footballer who plays as a forward.

Club career
Bouzrara made his debut for Tours in a 3–2 Ligue 2 loss to Gazélec Ajaccio on 20 April 2018. He signed his first professional contract with Orléans on 27 June 2020.

On 9 September 2020, Bouzrara joined Championnat National 2 side Saint-Pryvé Saint-Hilaire on loan for the 2020–21 season.

References

External links
 
 
 

2000 births
Living people
Association football forwards
French footballers
French sportspeople of Tunisian descent
Tours FC players
US Orléans players
Saint-Pryvé Saint-Hilaire FC players
Ligue 2 players
Championnat National players
Championnat National 2 players
Championnat National 3 players